An enthusiast is a person filled with or guided by enthusiasm.

Enthusiast or enthusiasts may also refer to:
 An alternate term for a fan
 Enthusiast (horse), a British Thoroughbred racehorse
 Enthusiast (personality type), of the Enneagram model
 The Enthusiasts, a Canadian rock band

See also
 Enthusiasm (disambiguation)